Gerard Doyle is an English actor and audiobook narrator. He has won 1 Audie Award and 35 Earphone Awards. AudioFile named him a Golden Voice Narrator.

Biography 
Doyle was born to Irish parents and was born and raised in England. He presently lives with his wife and two children in Sag Harbor, New York.

Aside from narrating audiobooks, Doyle teaches theatre at a private school.

Awards and honors

Awards

Honors 
AudioFile named Doyle a Golden Voice Narrator.

Filmography

References 

Living people
Year of birth missing (living people)
21st-century English actors
English actors
People from Sag Harbor, New York
Audiobook narrators
Audie Awards